Sydney George Hulme Beaman (1887 – 4 February 1932), was a British author, actor and illustrator. He was best known as the creator of the Toytown stories and their characters, including Larry the Lamb. He also illustrated the 1930s John Lane edition of a Strange Case of Dr Jekyll and Mr Hyde.

Early life

Beaman was born in Tottenham, Middlesex, as the oldest of three children to George Hulme Robert Beaman, a surveyor, and his wife Eleanor. Prior to his career in radio, Sydney worked as an insurance clerk.

Artistic career 
Toytown was first broadcast by the BBC on 19 July 1929 in the Children's Hour BBC Radio programme. Beaman would work out his ideas for the show in a miniature theatre at his home. The characters were cut out in wood and painted by him: Beamon made them perform as marionettes on the stage, and also provided the musical accompaniment.

He was often in the studio when his work was being broadcast, occasionally taking part in the programme. This continued until the last Tuesday before his death.

Personal life and death 
Beaman married Maud Mary Poltock on 19 April 1913 at All Saints Church in Fulham, west London. They had a son, Geoffrey, the following year.

Sydney Beaman died from pneumonia at home in Golders Green, Middlesex, aged 44. He was survived by his wife.

References

External links
Wally the Kangaroo, National Library of Australia

1887 births
1932 deaths
English children's writers
English illustrators
People from Middlesex (before 1965)
People from Golders Green
People from Tottenham
English actors